Rawa Buaya is an administrative village in the Cengkareng district of Jakarta. It formed part of the particuliere landen or private estates of N.V. Landbouw Maatschappij Tan Tiang Po, a colonial company belonging to Luitenant der Chinezen Tan Tiang Po and his son, Tan Liok Tiauw, Landheeren (or landlords) of Batoe-Tjepper.

Rawa Buaya's postal code is 11740.

See also 
 Cengkareng
 List of administrative villages of Jakarta

References

Administrative villages in Jakarta